Chloe Bennett Dallimore  (b. 1975?) is an Australian actor, singer and dancer, best known for performances in musical theatre.

Early life 
Dallimore began dance lessons on the Mornington Peninsula from a very young age then studied the Cecchetti ballet method and trained under singing teacher Gary May in Melbourne. She won a Cameron Mackintosh scholarship and moved to London at 17 where she took lessons in acting, tap and jazz dancing at the London Studio Centre.

Career 

In the early 1990s Dallimore came back to Australia to join the original Australian cast of Crazy for You.  She has appeared in many musicals since then including Chicago, The Addams Family, The Wizard of Oz and Joh for PM.

She has also appeared on television including Spicks and Specks and Good Morning Australia and in two documentaries The Show Must Go On (2017) and Andrew Lloyd Webber: Masterpiece (2002).

She is best known for her performance as Ulla in Mel Brooks' musical The Producers (2004/05). Standing 1.78 m (5' 10") her physique and dancing ability won her the role. For The Producers, Dallimore won the Helpmann Award for Best Female Actor in a Musical.

In 2011 she directed and choreographed Sweet Charity for the Central Queensland Conservatorium of Music in Mackay.

Dallimore provides musical entertainment, at times with PJ Lane, at corporate functions.

Reviews 
David Allen wrote of Dallimore after her casting with John Waters as the stars of The Addams Family (2013), John Waters and Chloe Dallimore have both carved out a place for themselves as icons in Australian showbiz – and more specifically they are icons of the Australian musical theatre. Their resumes are spectacularly diverse. Between the two of them, they have played some of the greatest roles ever written for the stage.Mel Brooks the writer/creator of The Producers commented to Dallimore in the role of Ulla,  "I love what you're doing in the show. Love your comic timing. The way you say you're going to belt [a song] and you belt."

MEAA Equity 
Dallimore is the President of Equity, the Australian union body for actors and other live performers.  Her previous roles have included serving on the National Performers Committee, involvement in Federal Council AGMs and negotiations with producers regarding Performers Collective Agreements.

As President Dallimore is currently gathering support from other performers against the importation of overseas performers to fill lead roles in upcoming musicals. In 2012 the peak body for producers in Australia, Live Performance Australia ended an agreement with the Media Entertainment and Arts Alliance on the casting of overseas performers. The lack of an Imported Artists Agreement has raised concerns for local performers.

Awards 
2005 Winner Victorian Green Room Association Awards Best leading female artist in music theatre: The Producers

2004 Winner Australian Dance Awards Outstanding Achievement in Commercial Dance, Musicals or Physical Theatre

2005 Winner Sydney Theatre Awards Best Actress in a Supporting Role: The Producers

2005 Winner Helpmann Awards Best Female Actor in a Musical: The Producers

2013 Nominated Helpmann Awards  for Best Female Actor in a Musical: The Addams Family

2023 Member of the Order of Australia in the 2023 Australia Day Honours

Mo Awards
The Australian Entertainment Mo Awards (commonly known informally as the Mo Awards), were annual Australian entertainment industry awards. They recognise achievements in live entertainment in Australia from 1975 to 2016.
 (wins only)
|-
| 2004
| Chloe Dallimore
| Female Musical Theatre Performer
| 
|-

Filmography

Theatre
Performances as listed on AusStage, Sydney Morning Herald  and JUTE Theatre Company,

References

External links 
Official website Chloe Dallimore

Australian television actresses
Australian film actresses
Australian stage actresses
Members of the Order of Australia
Helpmann Award winners
Living people
Year of birth missing (living people)
Actresses from Melbourne